Dominik Schwager (born 18 August 1976 in Munich) is a German auto racing driver.

Career
Schwager's racing career began with karting in Germany, participating in the national championship from 1989 to 1992 before moving to the Junior Karting World Championship in 1993.  Schwager went on to win a driver search held by BMW and the ADAC in 1993, earning him an entry in the Formula Junior open wheel series which he went on to win in 1995.  Schwager progressed to the German Formula Three Championship, initially finishing second in the B-Cup category before taking on the top tier championship in 1997.  Schwager was also selected to be part of the Benetton Formula junior team as part of a development program, aided by backing from BMW.  This support landed him in the International Formula 3000 series in 1998 with French squad Oreca, but only earned points in one round of the series.

For 1999, Schwager made a change to his racing career and moved from Europe to Japan, entering the Formula Nippon series as well as having his first taste of grand tourer racing by entering the All Japan Grand Touring Car Championship (JGTC) series in select rounds partnered with Hideshi Matsuda driving a Team Taisan Porsche.  Although Schwager scored only one point in the Formula Nippon season, he did earn two class wins in JGTC.  This early success in JGTC led Schwager to concentrate solely on the series, moving to the top GT500 category and partnering Daisuke Ito at Nakajima Racing in the Mobil 1 Honda NSX.  Schwager and Ito won two races and finished fourth in the points standings, while a further win was earned in the 2001 season.  Schwager remained with Honda into 2002 but turned to the Mugen Motorsports team before switching to the Toyota Supra in 2003 with SARD.  Schwager also made a return to Formula Nippon in 2003 with Kondo Racing but failed to score any points.  Schwager returned to his Taisan team in 2004, earning another win in the now renamed Super GT series in 2005.  Left without a contract for 2006, Schwager returned to Europe to drive in the Porsche Carrera Cup before returning to Super GT once again in the Team Kunimitsu NSX.

During the 2007 season, Schwager also participated in European races, driving in the Veranstaltergemeinschaft Langstreckenpokal Nürburgring (VLN) series as well as making his first start at the 24 Hours Nürburgring.  This expanded in 2008 when Schwager entered the new ADAC GT Masters series in a Callaway Corvette and won three races.  Schwager became a development driver for Alpina's GT3 program in 2009 while continuing in the VLN series before signing to drive with Münnich Motorsport in the inaugural FIA GT1 World Championship, driving Lamborghini.

Racing record
Despite earning points in only four races in the season, Schwager and teammate Nicky Pastorelli were retained by Münnich for 2011 where the duo earned two pole positions and one Championship Race win en route to finishing the season eighth in the standings.  Schwager and Pastorelli also participated in select rounds of the American Le Mans Series for West Racing.

Complete International Formula 3000 results
(key) (Races in bold indicate pole position) (Races in italics indicate fastest lap)

Complete JGTC/Super GT Results 
(key) (Races in bold indicate pole position) (Races in italics indicate fastest lap)

24 Hours of Le Mans results

Complete GT1 World Championship results

References

External links
 
 

1976 births
Living people
Sportspeople from Munich
Racing drivers from Bavaria
German racing drivers
German Formula Three Championship drivers
International Formula 3000 drivers
Formula Nippon drivers
Super GT drivers
FIA GT1 World Championship drivers
American Le Mans Series drivers
ADAC GT Masters drivers
International GT Open drivers
Nismo drivers
Nakajima Racing drivers
Team Kunimitsu drivers
Abt Sportsline drivers
Nürburgring 24 Hours drivers
Kondō Racing drivers
Oreca drivers
Rowe Racing drivers
Team LeMans drivers
Le Mans Cup drivers
Porsche Carrera Cup Germany drivers